Melanochaeta is a genus of fungi in the family Chaetosphaeriaceae.

References

External links

Sordariomycetes genera
Chaetosphaeriales